Daasi may refer to:

Daasi (TV series), 2019 Pakistani romantic drama
Daasi (1952 film), Indian drama
Daasi (1988 film), Indian Telugu drama